Shameeka Nikoda Fishley (born 19 September 1993) is an English footballer who plays as a forward in the Türkcell Women's Football Super League for Fenerbahçe in Turkey.

Early life
Sameeka Nikoda Fishley was born to Tracey Fishley in Leeds, England, on 19 September 1993.

She attended St Augustine's Catholic Primary School in Leeds in 2005 and completed her high school education in 2010. Between 2010 and 2012, she studied Sports Development, Coaching and Fitness at Merrist Wood College, England. In May 2011, she obtained an FA Coaching Diploma Level 1 from The Football Association, which is equivalent to a UEFA Pro Licence.

She then went to the United States, where she was educated in Personnel Administration in Human Resources Management at Davenport University in Michigan between 2013 and 2017.

Playing career
Fishley began playing football during her high school years. She was with  Leeds United Women F.C. U14, Seacroft Colts AFC U16, Huddersfield Town A.F.C. and Leeds City Vixens before she entered the youth academy team of Chelsea in 2011, where she played until 2013. She was with Davenport Panthers in the United States, She then played for the Icelandic club İB Vestmannaeyja in 2018, with the Italian A.S.D. AGSM Verona in 2017–18, and U.S. Sassuolo Calcio in the 2018–19 season, with UMF Stjarnan in Iceland again between 2019 and 2021, and with the Spanish EdF Logroño in 2021. In November 2021, she moved to Turkey and signed with the newly established team Fenerbahçe.

She scored a hat trick in her first game with Fenerbahçe against archrivals Galatasaray that was the first match of both newly established teams. The friendly match was played under the motto "End Violence Against Women" before the start of the 2021-22 Turkcell Women's Football Super League. It ended 7–0 for Fenerbahçe.

References

1993 births
Living people
Footballers from Leeds
English women's footballers
Women's association football forwards
Leeds United F.C. players
Huddersfield Town A.F.C. players
Leeds City Vixens L.F.C. players
Chelsea F.C. Women players
U.S. Sassuolo Calcio (women) players
Stjarnan women's football players
EdF Logroño players
Fenerbahçe S.K. women's football players
Turkish Women's Football Super League players
English expatriate women's footballers
English expatriate sportspeople in the United States
Expatriate women's soccer players in the United States
English expatriate sportspeople in Italy
Expatriate women's footballers in Italy
English expatriate sportspeople in Turkey
Expatriate women's footballers in Turkey
Black British sportswomen
English sportspeople of Jamaican descent